Kumiz may refer to:

Kumiz, Hormozgan
Kumiz, Razavi Khorasan